Warm on a Cold Night is the debut studio album by British electronic duo Honne. It was released on 22 July 2016 by Tatemae and Atlantic Records. The album features guest appearance by British singer-songwriter Izzy Bizu.

Critical reception

Upon its release, Warm on a Cold Night received generally positive reviews from music critics. Writing for AllMusic, Liam Martin gave the album 4 out of 5 stars and highlighted the tracks, "Warm on a Cold Night", "Someone That Loves You" and "Treat You Right". Lisa Henderson from Clash magazine called the album as "an irresistible piece of steamy electro-soul" and gave the album an 8 out of 10, while Kitty Empire from The Observer called it "danceable, but not braindead". Writing for NOW Magazine, Paula Reid gave the album 3 out of 5 stars, saying, "Andy and James stepped deeper into their own sound, with more inventive lyrics and dynamic melodies." Reid also noted the 1970s and 1980s soul and funk influences in the album. The Guardian gave a mixed review of the album, saying, "a studied sort of soul that belongs more in a Spotify aggregated playlist than on a sleazy late-night radio show."

Liam McNeilly from DIY Magazine gave the album 2 out of 5 stars, saying, "Honne’s debut could be a triumph, but finds itself prone to mumbling and shallowness."

Commercial performance
Warm on a Cold Night made its debut in United Kingdom at number thirty-seven. The album sold 2,227 copies in its first week.

Track listing
Credits adapted from Tidal.All tracks written by Andy Clutterbuck and James Hatcher, except where noted. All tracks produced by Honne, except where noted.

Notes
 "Warm on a Cold Night" features voice-over by William Coutts.
 "Coastal Love" features additional vocals by Tamsin Wilson.
 "It Ain't Wrong Loving You", "Good Together" and "Take You High" feature additional vocals by House Gospel Choir.

Personnel
Credits adapted from Tidal.

Performers and musicians

Andy Clutterbuck – vocals, songwriting, keyboard, bass guitar, drums, guitar, programming, synthesizer
James Hatcher – vocals, songwriting, keyboard, bass guitar, drums, guitar, programming, synthesizer
William Coutts – songwriting, voice-over
Izzy Bizu – vocals, songwriting
Tamsin Wilson – vocals
House Gospel Choir – vocals
Alex Reeves – drums
Hal Ritson – programming
Richard Adlam – programming
Richard Wilkinson – programming

Production

Richard Wilkinson – production
Andy Clutterbuck – production
James Hatcher – production
Mark 'Spike' Stent – mixing
Wez Clarke – mixing
Manny Marroquin – mixing
Chris Galland – mixing
Stuart Hawkes – mastering engineer
Robin Florent – engineering
Richard Adlam – engineering
Hal Ritson – engineering
Steve Honest – engineering
Jett Jackson – engineering

Charts

Release history

References

Honne (band) albums
2016 debut albums
Atlantic Records albums